The Civic Movement United Reform Action, commonly known as simply United Reform Action, or by its abbreviation URA, is a green, socially liberal, and pro-European party in Montenegro. The current party leader is incumbent Prime Minister Dritan Abazović.

History

Founded in March 2015 by Žarko Rakčević, a civil engineer and former member and president of Social Democratic Party, before the 2016 parliamentary election URA had two MPs in the Parliament of Montenegro: Dritan Abazović and Miloš Konatar, both elected in 2012 from the electoral list of Positive Montenegro. 

In September 2016, URA decided to enter the Key Coalition with Demos and SNP in order to participate at the forthcoming parliamentary election. The Key Coalition won 11.05% of votes and 9 seats, two of them being won by URA candidates. In 2017, Dritan Abazović was elected as the new party leader.

On 13 June 2020, the Civic Movement URA was officially admitted to the European Greens. URA decided to run independently at the 2020 parliamentary election, presenting its green politics and anti-corruption In Black and White" election platform, led by independent candidates, including well known journalist and activist Milka Tadić, some university professors, journalists, civic and NGO activists, with the party leader Dritan Abazović as a ballot carrier. URA electoral list also contains one representative of the Bosniak minority Justice and Reconciliation Party, as well of some minor localist parties and initiatives.

On 4 December 2020, the new big tent cabinet of Montenegro was elected by 41 out of 81 members of the Parliament of Montenegro, and independent candidate Zdravko Krivokapić became the new Prime Minister of Montenegro, with the Civic Movement URA leader Dritan Abazović as new Deputy Prime Minister, formally ending three decades of the Milo Đukanović's DPS-led regime in Montenegro.

Elections

Parliamentary elections

 Opposition (2015—2016); Provisional government (2016)

Presidential elections

 Independent candidate, support

References

2015 establishments in Montenegro
Political parties established in 2015
Green political parties
Social liberal parties
Liberal parties in Montenegro
Pro-European political parties in Montenegro